In the 2011 United Kingdom local elections, the Conservative Party held onto the Mid Suffolk District Council for a third term and even increased their majority. The Liberal Democrats lost four seats but remained in second place while the Green Party and the Labour Party each gained a seat, which is Labour's only seat on the Council.

Note: The seven Independents also include two Suffolk Together Councillors who held onto their seats.

The four Green Party councillors lead a group including the two Suffolk Together councillors and two Independents, the group of eight forming the official opposition.

Election result

Wards
The list of wards are shown below:

Bacton and Old Newton Ward
Badwell Ash Ward
Barking and Somersham Ward
Bramford and Blakenham Ward
Claydon and Barham Ward
Debenham Ward
Elmswell and Norton Ward
Eye Ward
Fressingfield Ward
Gislingham Ward
Haughley and Wetherden Ward
Helmingham and Coddenham Ward
Hoxne Ward
Mendlesham Ward
Needham Market Ward
Onehouse Ward
Palgrave Ward
Rattlesden Ward
Rickinghall and Walsham Ward
Ringshall Ward
Stowmarket (Central) Ward
Stowmarket (North) Ward
Stowmarket (South) Ward
Stowupland Ward
Stradbroke and Laxfield Ward
The Stonhams Ward
Thurston and Hessett Ward
Wetheringsett Ward
Woolpit Ward
Worlingworth Ward

References

External links
Mid Suffolk District Council- Mid Suffolk District Council Results

Mid Suffolk District Council elections
2011 English local elections
2010s in Suffolk